No One is a Mexican documentary film by Tin Dirdamal on the impoverished Central Americans who leave their countries in hope of a better life in the United States. It premiered in 2005 and was shown at different international film festivals, winning the Sundance Film Festival audience award for World Documentary in 2006.

The film follows a number of refugees who have to cross Mexico, about 4,000 kilometers, before reaching the US border. On their way through Mexico they put their remaining money, dignity, health and life on the line.

The soundtrack was written by Mexican composer Alfonso M.

References

External links 

Interview with Tin Dirdamal (indiewire.com)

2005 films
2000s Spanish-language films
Mexican documentary films
Documentary films about refugees
Documentary films about immigration to the United States
2005 documentary films
2000s Mexican films